Lerwick Town Hall is a municipal building located in central Lerwick, Shetland, Scotland. The town hall, which is the headquarters of Shetland Islands Council, is a Category A listed building.

History

For much of the 19th century meetings of the local council were held in the Parish Kirk in Queens Lane. After a period of rapid population expansion in Lerwick associated with the growth in the herring industry, civic leaders decided to procure a purpose-built town hall: a site on the north Hillhead was selected.

The foundation stone for the new building was laid by Prince Alfred, Duke of Edinburgh on a visit to the isles on 24 January 1882. That same evening Lerwick saw the first ever Up Helly Aa torchlight procession. The new building was designed by architect, Alexander Ross from Inverness, in the Scottish Baronial style and builder John M. Aitken of Lerwick won the tender competition with a price of £3,240. The building was officially opened by George Thoms, Sheriff of Caithness, Orkney and Shetland, on 30 July 1883. The design involved a symmetrical frontage with five bays facing on Hillhead; the central section featured an arched doorway on the ground floor; there was an oriel window on the first floor with a pediment bearing a coat of arms above and there were bartizans at the corners of the building. There was a battlemented tower on the east side and a rose window on the north side. Internally, the principal rooms were a council chamber and a courtroom; there were also police cells in the building.

Stained glass windows, designed by James Ballantine & Son, were subsequently installed in the building: these included a depiction of the marriage between Margaret of Denmark and James III of Scotland in 1469. There were also windows presented by the Corporation of Amsterdam and the Corporation of Hamburg. Panels with the coats of arms of Aberdeen, Edinburgh, Glasgow and Leith, which had been presented by the respective corporations, were installed in a corridor. A clock, designed and manufactured by Potts of Leeds, was installed in the tower in 1887. 

The town hall was the headquarters of Lerwick Town Council until 1975 and was the home of the Shetland Islands Council until 2022. The front steps, which had badly decayed, were replaced in spring 2008 and the local registrar's office moved from the County Buildings to Lerwick Town Hall in February 2015. The Duke of Rothesay visited the town hall and reviewed the conservation work being undertaken in July 2021.

Works of art in the town hall include a portrait of Queen Elizabeth II by Leonard Boden and a portrait of Charles Rampini, Sheriff of Dumfries and Galloway, by John Henry Lorimer.

Services
The town hall is used for functions such as marriages, wedding receptions, concerts, coffee mornings and evening events.

See also
 List of listed buildings in Lerwick

References

Government buildings completed in 1883
Category A listed buildings in Shetland
Lerwick
City chambers and town halls in Scotland
1883 establishments in Scotland
Listed government buildings in Scotland
Politics of Shetland